The Muma College of Business is the University of South Florida's business school. It conferred its first degree in 1963 and was named for businessman Les Muma in 2014. There are currently approximately 5,000 undergraduate students and 2,000 graduate students enrolled. 

USF Muma offers undergraduate majors in Accounting, Advertising, Business Analytics and Information Systems, Entrepreneurship and Innovation (A Rising National Program), Finance, Global Business, Hospitality Management, Information Assurance and Cybersecurity Management, Management, Marketing, Personal Financial Planning, Risk Management and Insurance, and Supply Chain Management.

Muma offers graduate majors in Accountancy, Business Analytics and Information Systems, Finance, Information Assurance and Cybersecurity Management, Management, Marketing, Supply Chain Management, Entrepreneurship and Applied Technologies, Business Administration, Sports and Entertainment Management, and Big Data Analytics.

Muma classes are offered on all three of USF's campuses: Tampa, St. Petersburg, and Sarasota–Manatee.

References 

University of South Florida
Business schools in Florida